Acompsia cinerella, the ash-coloured sober, is a small lepidopteran species of the twirler moth family (Gelechiidae). It is the type species of the genus Acompsia, once assigned to the subfamily Anacampsinae but generally placed in the Dichomeridinae. The species was first described by Carl Alexander Clerck in 1759.

Distribution
This species can be found in most of Europe, except for Portugal and Iceland.

Habitat
These moths inhabit a variety of areas, preferably with rich vegetation or bushes.

Description
Acompsia cinerella has a wingspan of 16–19 mm. These moths have long upwardly-curved labial palps. The forewings show a brownish colour, without any marking. This species is rather similar to Helcystogramma rufescens.

Biology
There are two generations per year, as it is a bivoltine species. Adults are on wing from May to September. The larvae feed on moss present on trunks of broad leaves trees, often at the base of the tree.

Bibliography
Erstbeschreibung: Clerck, C. (1759): Icones Insectorum rariorum Cum Nominibus eorum trivialibus, locisqve e C. LinnaeiArch. R. et Eqv. Aur. Syst. Nat. allegatis. Sectio Prima: [8 unpaginierte Textseiten], pl. 1-16. Holmiae. — Digitalisat der Bibliothèque nationale de France.
Lectotypus-Festlegung: Robinson, G. S. & E. Schmidt Nielsen (1983): The Microlepidoptera described by Linnaeus and Clerck. — Systematic Entomology 8: 191–242.

References

External links

 Lepiforum e. V.
 Insects of the British Isles

Acompsia
Moths described in 1759
Moths of Europe
Taxa named by Carl Alexander Clerck